INOX Leisure or INOX Movies is an Indian multiplex chain based in Mumbai. As of December 2022, it has 170 multiplexes and 722 screens in 74 cities of the country. INOX Leisure Limited is the entertainment venture of the INOX Group.

History 
The company was incorporated as a public limited company in November 1999. It is a subsidiary of INOX Group of Companies. In 2002, the company commenced its operation by opening its first four-screen multiplex at Pune and another four-screen multiplex at Vadodara. In 2004, multiplexes were added in Kolkata, Goa, and Mumbai.

In 2006, the company went public by issuing 1,65,00,000 equity shares of ₹10 each with pricing of ₹120 per share consisting of a fresh issue of 1,20,00,000 equity shares of ₹10 each and an offer for sale of 45,00,000 equity shares of ₹10 each by Gujarat Fluorochemicals.

Over the years, more screens were added in cities including Bangalore, Jaipur, Indore, Darjeeling, Kota, Rajasthan, and Lucknow.

Mergers & acquisitions
In 2006, INOX acquired 89 Cinemas, owned by Calcutta Cinema Private Ltd (CCPL), in a share swap deal, giving INOX ownership of nine multiplexes in West Bengal and Assam.

INOX acquired Satyam Cineplexes Limited by way of acquisition of 100% of the equity share capital from its existing shareholders which is valued at ₹182 crores.

On 27 March 2022, INOX announced it would be merging with PVR Cinemas, the largest cinema chain in India.

Sustainability 
According to INOX’s Director Siddharth Jain, in 2018, the Metro INOX multiplex at Mumbai became India's first cinema to be powered by solar power. And in 2021, the company installed electric vehicle charging station at its multiplex in Pune & Vadodara.

Awards
 2005 - 'ICICI Entertainment Retailer of the Year' Award.
 2006 - TAAL Multiplexer Award.
 2007 - Emerging Superbrand of the year.
2016 - Big Cine Expo Awards' Best Technology Adopter of the Year
2017 - India Retail Forum's Entertainment Retailer of the Year

Gallery

References

External links 
 

Inox Group
Companies based in Mumbai
Cinema chains in India
Indian companies established in 1999
Entertainment companies established in 1999
1999 establishments in India
Companies listed on the Bombay Stock Exchange
Announced mergers and acquisitions